An Evening with Billie Holiday (MG C-144) is the second 10-inch LP studio album by jazz singer Billie Holiday, released by Clef Records in 1953.

In 1956, when the 10-inch format was phased out, the album was reissued by Clef with the same artwork, and seven of the eight tracks, as a 12-inch LP called A Recital by Billie Holiday (MG C-686). The track "Tenderly", was moved to another 12-inch compilation called Solitude. Five additional tracks were added that had been previously released on her third 10-inch LP, simply titled Billie Holiday.

Track listing

1953 10" LP, An Evening with Billie Holiday 
A side
"Stormy Weather" (Harold Arlen, Ted Koehler) – 3:41
"Lover Come Back to Me" (Sigmund Romberg, Oscar Hammerstein II)  – 3:36
"My Man" (Jacques Charles, Channing Pollack, Albert Willemetz, Maurice Yvain) – 2:37
"He's Funny That Way" (Richard Whiting, Neil Moret) – 3:11
B side
"Yesterdays" (Jerome Kern, Otto Harbach) – 2:49
"Tenderly" (Walter Gross, Jack Lawrence) – 3:23
"I Can't Face the Music" (Rube Bloom, Ted Koehler) – 3:14
"Remember" (Irving Berlin) - 2:34

1956 12" LP, A Recital By Billie Holiday 
A side
 "If the Moon Turns Green" (George Cates, Bernie Hanighen) – 2:46
 "Remember" (Irving Berlin) - 2:34
 "Autumn in New York" (Vernon Duke) – 3:43
 "My Man" (Jacques Charles, Channing Pollack, Albert Willemetz, Maurice Yvain) – 2:37
 "Lover Come Back to Me" (Sigmund Romberg, Oscar Hammerstein II)  – 3:36
 "Stormy Weather" (Harold Arlen, Ted Koehler) – 3:41
B side
 "Yesterdays" (Jerome Kern, Otto Harbach – 2:49
 "He's Funny That Way" (Richard Whiting, Neil Moret) – 3:11
 "I Can't Face the Music" (Rube Bloom, Ted Koehler) – 3:14
 "How Deep Is the Ocean?" (Irving Berlin) – 3:00
 "What a Little Moonlight Can Do" (Harry M. Woods) – 3:14
 "I Cried for You" (Gus Arnheim, Arthur Freed, Abe Lyman) – 2:27

Personnel
The personnel of the original 10-inch "LP are from two different recording dates, with different musicians. The 12-inch LP adds one track from each of the two sessions, as well as three tracks from a 1954 session.

April 1952 Personnel (exact date unknown)
(Evening tracks B3-4; Recital tracks A1-A3):
Billie Holiday - vocals
Charlie Shavers - trumpet
Flip Phillips - tenor saxophone
Oscar Peterson - piano
Barney Kessel - guitar
Alvin Stoller - drums
Ray Brown - bass

July 27, 1952 Personnel 
(Evening tracks A1-B2; Recital tracks A4-6, B1-3):
Billie Holiday - vocals
Joe Newman - trumpet
Paul Quinichette - tenor saxophone
Oscar Peterson - piano (organ on "Yesterdays")
Freddie Green - guitar
Gus Johnson - drums
Ray Brown - bass

April 14, 1954 Recordings
 (Recital tracks B4-6)
Billie Holiday - vocals
Charlie Shavers - trumpet
Oscar Peterson - piano
Herb Ellis - guitar
Ed Shaughnessy - drums
Ray Brown - bass

References

1953 albums
Billie Holiday albums
Clef Records albums
Verve Records albums
Albums produced by Norman Granz
Albums with cover art by David Stone Martin